Naemon is an open-source computer system monitoring, network monitoring and infrastructure monitoring software application. Naemon offers monitoring and alerting services for servers, switches, applications, and services. It alerts the users when things go wrong and alerts them a second time when the problem has been resolved. Naemon was created in 2014 as a fork of Nagios.

It is available for Red Hat, CentOS, SUSE, Debian and Ubuntu Linux distribution.

Overview 
Naemon is open source software licensed under the GNU GPL V2. It provides:
 Monitoring of network services (SMTP, POP3, HTTP, NNTP, PING, etc.).
 Monitoring of host resources (processor load, disk usage, etc.).
 A simple plugin design that allows users to easily develop their own service checks.
 Parallelized service checks.
 Thruk Monitoring Webinterface.
 The ability to define network host hierarchies using 'parent' hosts, allowing the detection of and distinction between hosts that are down or unreachable.
 Contact notifications when service or host problems occur and get resolved (via e-mail, pager, or any user-defined method through plugin system).
 The ability to define event handlers to be run during service or host events for proactive problem resolution
 Automatic log file rotation
 Support for implementing redundant monitoring hosts

See also 

Comparison of network monitoring systems
Nagios
Icinga – Another Nagios fork
Shinken (software) – Another Nagios fork

References

External links 
 Official Naemon website

Internet Protocol based network software
Free network management software
Multi-agent network management software
Network analyzers